Somayajulu was an Indian politician and former Member of the Legislative Assembly. He was elected to the Tamil Nadu legislative assembly as an Indian National Congress candidate from Tirunelveli constituency in 1952 election. He was one of the winners from the constituency, the other being Arumugam.

References 

Indian National Congress politicians from Tamil Nadu
Living people
Year of birth missing (living people)
Madras MLAs 1952–1957